Sancho VI may refer to:

 Sancho VI William of Gascony (d. 1032)
 Sancho VI of Navarre (1132–1194)